The 1997 Ball State Cardinals football team was an American football team that represented Ball State University in the West Division of the Mid-American Conference (MAC) during the 1997 NCAA Division I-A football season. In its third season under head coach Bill Lynch, the team compiled a 5–6 record (4–4 against conference opponents) and finished in third place out of six teams in the MAC West. The team played its home games at Ball State Stadium in Muncie, Indiana.

The team's statistical leaders included Jake Josetti with 1,569 passing yards, LeAndre Moore with 884 rushing yards, Adrian Reese with 526 receiving yards, and Brent Lockliear with 55 points scored.

Schedule

References

Ball State
Ball State Cardinals football seasons
Ball State Cardinals football